Han Yutong (born 16 September 1994) is a Chinese female short track speed skater.

References

1994 births
Living people
Chinese female short track speed skaters
Universiade medalists in short track speed skating
Olympic short track speed skaters of China
Short track speed skaters at the 2018 Winter Olympics
Short track speed skaters at the 2022 Winter Olympics
Medalists at the 2022 Winter Olympics
Olympic bronze medalists for China
Olympic medalists in short track speed skating
Universiade gold medalists for China
Universiade bronze medalists for China
Competitors at the 2015 Winter Universiade
21st-century Chinese women